Kristina Edström (born 2 June 1958) is a Swedish Professor of Inorganic Chemistry at Uppsala University. She also serves as Head of the Ångström Advanced Battery Centre (ÅABC) and has previously been both Vice Dean for Research at the Faculty of Science and Technology and Chair of the STandUp for Energy research programme.

Early life and education 
Edström was born 1958 in Gothenburg. She studied chemistry at Uppsala University and earned her doctoral degree in 1990. For her doctoral research, Edström worked with Josh Thomas on solid electrolytes, including beta-alumina. She was appointed as research assistant at Uppsala University in 1995. At the time, she was interested in designing materials with special properties. She worked with Ericsson Mobile Communications on lithium-ion batteries for mobile phones.

Research and career 
Edström works on batteries and novel electrode materials. She has worked on lithium-ion, lithium–air and sodium-ion batteries. Her research has particularly considered new anode materials, using photoemission spectroscopy to identify the impact of interlayers and interfaces.

When rechargeable batteries are charged and discharged, they lose a little of their capacity. This degradation could because by crystals that form at the electrodes. Edström's recent work has considered self-repairing batteries using polymers. Polymers can form weak hydrogen bonds with other polymer chains or the surfaces of electrodes. Edström has proposed using polymers on the surface of electrodes in an effort to stop them from cracking. She has synthesised a range of polymers and investigated them using spectroscopic electrochemistry, as well as modelling the interfaces between the electrode and electrolyte. The electrolytes used by Edström include fixed ceramic and salt-based electrolytes. She is interested in battery technologies for the automotive industry.

She leads the Ångström Advanced Battery Centre at Uppsala University, which is the largest group in all of the Nordic countries. She is leading a European Commission project, the EU Large-Scale Research Initiative BATTERY 2030+, that is developing next generation energy storage materials.

Academic service 
Edström was promoted to Professor at Uppsala University in 2005. She has served as Vice Dean for Research at the Faculty of Science and Technology, and Vice Chancellor of the Degree Program. Alongside her research, Edström is involved with mentoring and teaching early career researchers. She has said that "I’m like an umbrella with different groupings of researchers, who all seek and receive their own research grants. It’s fun to see doctoral students take the leap...They make faster progress in their own area than I can. It’s so cool!”.

From 2010 to 2017 Edström served as Chair of the STandUp for Energy research programme. The programme includes KTH Royal Institute of Technology, Luleå University of Technology and the Swedish University of Agricultural Sciences. From 2016 to 2021 Edström is Director of SwedNess, a graduate programme in neutron scattering.

She is a member of the Royal Swedish Academy of Sciences and the Royal Swedish Academy of Engineering Sciences.

Awards and honours 

 2001 Luttemans scholarship
 2002 Royal Swedish Academy of Sciences Benzelius Prize
 2008 The Thuréus Prize
 2011 Uppsala University Gold Medal
 2017 Norwegian University of Science and Technology Honorary Doctorate
 2018 KTH Great Prize
 2019 Uppsala University Rudbeck Medal
 2019 Wallenberg Scholar

Selected publications 

 D. Larcher, S. Beattie, M. Morcrette, K. Edström, J.-C. Jumas, J.-M. Tarascon; Recent findings and prospects in the field of pure metals as negative electrodes for Li-ion batteries; Journal of Materials Chemistry, 3759-3772 (17), 2007. doi:10.1039/b705421c
 K. Edström, T. Gustafsson, J. Thomas; The cathode–electrolyte interface in the Li-ion battery, Electrochimica Acta, 337–364, 2004. doi:10.1016/j.electacta.2004.03.049
 A.M. Andersson, K. Edström; Chemical composition and morphology of the elevated temperature SEI on graphite; Journal of The Electrochemical Society, A1100-A1109 (148), 2001. doi:10.1149/1.1397771
 K. Edström, M. Herstedt, D.P. Abraham; A new look at the solid electrolyte interphase on graphite anodes in Li-ion batteries; Journal of Power Sources, 380-384 (153), 2006. doi:10.1016/j.jpowsour.2005.05.062
 A.M. Andersson, M. Herstedt, A.G. Bishop, K. Edström; The influence of lithium salt on the interfacial reactions controlling the thermal stability of graphite anodes; Electrochimica Acta; 1885-1898 (47), 2002. doi:10.1016/S0013-4686(02)00044-0
 B. Philippe, R. Dedryvère, J. Allouche, F. Lindgren, M. Gorgoi, H. Rensmo, D. Gonbeau, K. Edström; Nanosilicon electrodes for lithium-ion batteries: interfacial mechanisms studied by hard and soft X-ray photoelectron spectroscopy; Chemistry of Materials, 1107-1115 (24), 2012. doi:10.1021/cm2034195
 L. Fransson, J.T. Vaughey, R.A. Benedek, K. Edström, J.O. Thomas, M.M. Thackeray; Phase transitions in lithiated Cu2Sb anodes for lithium batteries: an in situ X-ray diffraction study; Electrochemistry Communications, 317-323 (3), 2001. doi:10.1016/S1388-2481(01)00140-0
 S.K. Cheah, E. Perre, M. Rooth, M. Fondell, A. Hårsta, L. Nyholm, M. Boman, T. Gustafsson, J. Lu, P. Simon, K. Edström; Self-supported three-dimensional nanoelectrodes for microbattery applications; Nano letters, 3230-3233 (9), 2009. doi:10.1021/nl9014843
 H. Bryngelsson, M. Stjerndahl, T. Gustafsson, K. Edström; How dynamic is the SEI?; Journal of Power Sources, 970-975 (174) 2007. doi:10.1016/j.jpowsour.2007.06.050
 A.M. Andersson, A. Henningson, H. Siegbahn, U. Jansson, K. Edström; Electrochemically lithiated graphite characterised by photoelectron spectroscopy; Journal of Power Sources, 522-527 (119) 2003. doi:10.1016/S0378-7753(03)00277-5

References 

Swedish women academics
Swedish women scientists
Swedish materials scientists
Academic staff of Uppsala University
Uppsala University alumni
People from Gothenburg
1958 births
Living people
Members of the Royal Swedish Academy of Sciences
Members of the Royal Swedish Academy of Engineering Sciences